Since 2001, Singapore Raffles Music College (Abbreviation: SRMC; Chinese: 新加坡莱佛士音乐学院; pinyin: Xīnjiāpō Láifoshi Yīnyuè Xuéyuan) has been one of Singapore’s leading schools for higher learning in music and dance, registered with the Committee for Private Education (CPE). The College was recently awarded the EduTrust 4-Year award in 2021, certifying that SRMC has reached high standards in key areas of management and provision of educational services. It enrolled its first students in 2006.

The college's campus is located in at 456 Alexandra Road. It offers a range of Certificate to Masters courses in Music Performance, Music Production, Music Studies and Dance. 

Since 2010, SRMC has partnered the University of West London to offer various Music and Dance degree programmes.

Academic Faculties

Music Performance Faculty 
Music Performance Faculty consists of dedicated lecturers with both experience and expertise. The various lecturers hone the artistry of the students through a combination of one-to-one training and ensemble work, nurturing them into the next generation of musicians to make their mark in the music industry. 

The Music Performance Faculty consists of seven departments:
 Classical Piano Department
 Western Instruments Department
 Chinese Instruments Department
Classical Vocals Department
Popular Vocals Department
Contemporary Instruments Department
Composition Department

Music Production Faculty 
Lecturers in the Music Production Faculty play a crucial role in nurturing music and studio managers by imparting the practical skill-sets necessary for the students to negotiate the dynamic industry. Relying on their vast industry knowledge, lecturers train the students to become well-rounded music practitioners and improve their employ-ability in the modern music industry.

The Music Production Faculty consists of two departments:
 Music Management Department
Music Recording Department

Music Studies Faculty 
Focusing on areas such as Theory, History, and Analysis, the Music Studies Faculty supports the holistic development of students into matured music practitioners. Through projects and discussions, lecturers guide students towards approaching music from a critical perspective. Students are given the opportunity to explore different viewpoints and find their unique voice.

Dance Faculty 
The Dance Faculty is committed to helping aspiring dancers refine their performance and choreography skills. Through practical training, lecturers draw on their diverse backgrounds to guide students towards a comprehensive understanding of various dance forms. The faculty is made up of talented individuals, with rich experience across genres such as, Ballet, Hip-Hop, Jazz, and Chinese Dance.

Courses 
SRMC students choose from the range of Certificate to Masters' Degree:

Music 

 Certificate In Music (awarded by Singapore Raffles Music College)
 Diploma In Music (awarded by Singapore Raffles Music College)
 Advanced Diploma In Music (awarded by Singapore Raffles Music College)
 Graduate Diploma in Professional Artist (awarded by Singapore Raffles Music College)
 Preparatory Course in Violin Studies (awarded by Singapore Raffles Music College)
 Bachelor of Music (Honours) Composition (awarded by University of West London, London College of Music)
 Bachelor of Music (Honours) Music Performance and Recording (awarded by University of West London, London College of Music)
 Bachelor of Music (Honours) Music Performance - Level 6 (awarded by University of West London, London College of Music)
 Bachelor of Arts (Honours) Music Management (awarded by University of West London, London College of Music)
 Master of Music in Performance (awarded by University of West London, London College of Music)

Dance 

 Advanced Diploma In Dance (awarded by Singapore Raffles Music College)
 Graduate Diploma in Performance Artist (Dance) (Mandarin) (awarded by Singapore Raffles Music College)
 Foundation Degree in Dance (awarded by University of West London, London College of Music)
 Bachelor of Arts (Honours) Dance - Level 6 (awarded by University of West London, London College of Music)

Notable Faculty Members 
 Tan Chan Boon, established Singaporean composer 
 Dr Samuel Wong, PhD in ethnomusicology and Artistic Director of TENG Ensemble
 Benjamin Lim Yi, Singaporean composer and recipient of the Singapore National Arts Council Scholarship in 2013. Composer-in-residence at TENG Ensemble
 Zhu Lin, Erhu II Principal at the Singapore Chinese Orchestra

 Bevlyn Khoo, jazz-pop singer and songwriter based in Singapore

References 

Private universities in Singapore
Music schools in Singapore
2001 establishments in Singapore
Educational institutions established in 2001